Ebrima M. Mballow (died 19 February 2023) was a Gambian banker, diplomat, and politician. He served as Minister of the Interior from 2018 to 2019.

Mballow died in Saudi Arabia on 19 February 2023.

References

20th-century births
Year of birth missing
2023 deaths
Interior ministers of the Gambia
People from West Coast Division (The Gambia)
21st-century Gambian politicians